The Wedding of the Great Šišlam is a Mandaean religious text. As a liturgical rather than esoteric text, it contains instructions and hymns for the Mandaean marriage ceremony. Traditionally, Mandaean priests recite the entire book at Mandaean marriage ceremonies. The hymns in the text often contain the refrain "When the proven, the Pure One Went." Unlike most other Mandaean ritual scrolls, The Wedding of the Great Šišlam is not illustrated.

Manuscripts and translations
Copies of the text include Manuscript 38 of the Drower Collection (DC 38), currently held at the Bodleian Library. A full transliteration, English translation, and commentary were published as a book by E. S. Drower in 1953.

Manuscripts held at the Bibliothèque nationale de France include:
Code Sabéen 15 (Mark Lidzbarski's F manuscript) (partial copy)
Code Sabéen 25 (Mark Lidzbarski's E manuscript) (partial copy)

Contents
The DC 38 manuscript has five parts. However, since Part 5 is a duplicate of Part 1, there are only four unique parts.

Part 1 (about 240 lines): instructions on how to perform each step of the Mandaean wedding ceremony, with ritual and Qolasta prayer sequences
Part 2 (about 110 lines): hymns
Part 3 (about 1,320 lines): hymns
Part 4 (just over 170 lines): titled "The weekly forecast of hourly fortune," an astrological treatise dealing with the planets and times of the day and week

See also
Qabin, the Mandaean wedding ritual

References

External links
Full text at Archive.org
Diwan Sharh d-Qabin d-Shishlam Rba (Mandaic text from the Mandaean Network)
Diwan Sharh d-Qabin d-Shishlam Rba (Mandaic text from the Mandaean Network)

Mandaean texts
Works about wedding